Ulotrichopus ochreipennis is a moth of the  family Erebidae. It is found in Madagascar.

References

Moths described in 1878
Ulotrichopus
Moths of Africa